Linley, later Linley Halt, was a small railway station on the Severn Valley line in Shropshire, England.

The station was built as a condition of constructing the railway at the behest of Thomas C. Whitmore of Apley Park estate, through which the railway runs. Apley Hall lies on the opposite bank of the River Severn to the station. Access from the estate to the station was originally by ferry and later via a chain suspension bridge.
 
The single siding accessed by means of a ground frame was taken out of use in December 1957. The siding connected with the running line with a trailing connection in the up direction. The station closed on 9 September 1963 as part of the planned closure of the northern end of the Severn Valley Line which pre-dated the Beeching report.

The little altered station building survives as a private residence although the canopy that provided shelter to passengers on the platform has been removed. The building is to the same design as Hampton Loade, on the preserved Severn Valley Railway.

References

Further reading

Disused railway stations in Shropshire
Former Great Western Railway stations
Railway stations in Great Britain opened in 1862
Railway stations in Great Britain closed in 1917
Railway stations in Great Britain opened in 1917
Railway stations in Great Britain closed in 1963
1862 establishments in England